South Yarra railway station is the junction for the Cranbourne, Frankston, Pakenham and Sandringham lines in Victoria, Australia. It serves the south-eastern Melbourne suburb of South Yarra, and opened on 22 December 1860 as Gardiners Creek Road. It was renamed South Yarra on 1 January 1867.

V/Line's Bairnsdale rail services (Gippsland line) pass non-stop through the station.

History
South Yarra station opened on 22 December 1860 by the Melbourne and Suburban Railway Company as Gardiner's Creek Road. Initially, it served the Brighton line, on what was called the "Prahran Branch". On 1 January 1867, the station was renamed South Yarra. The private railway company, by then the Melbourne and Hobson's Bay United Railway Company, was taken over by the Government of Victoria in 1878, and its network became part of the Victorian Railways.

John Cooper (1924) notes that when the South Yarra to Oakleigh line was first constructed, a set of points connected the line to the existing Brighton line. However, it was found that a high embankment obscured the vision of the drivers of approaching trains on both lines. To solve that problem, it was decided that the Oakleigh line should have its own tracks into Melbourne and, soon after, a second bridge, spanning the Yarra River, was built to facilitate that (p. 307). The opening of the South Yarra to Oakleigh line in 1879 made the proposed Outer Circle line largely redundant, but it was constructed anyway, a decade later.

In 1914, the line between South Yarra and Caulfield was completely rebuilt. The works included the quadruplication of the line, and rebuilt stations at Hawksburn, Toorak, Armadale and Malvern.

In 1946, the current bridge over the Yarra River was provided. In 1947, a works siding opened and, in 1955, was disconnected.

Even after the laying of six tracks from Richmond to South Yarra, and the abolition of the signal box, the station retained three emergency crossovers at the up end of Platforms 1 and 2, 3 and 4 and 5 and 6. The latter set was removed in 1983, followed by the middle pair by 23 June 1984, and the final set in August 1986. The crossovers were originally provided in 1945 and 1960. Also in 1960, the "local lines", used by Pakenham and Cranbourne line services, were extended to Richmond, and the signal box, located at the up end of Platforms 4 and 5, was abolished. The signal box still remains in a disused state.

In 1993, major re-signalling works occurred between South Yarra and Toorak, with similar works occurring between South Yarra and Richmond in 1994. In 1997, South Yarra was upgraded to a Premium Station. As such, the station is staffed from the first to the last service each day.

According to Public Transport Victoria data, it is the eighth-busiest station on the Melbourne metropolitan network, with 4.59 million boardings per year during the 2017/2018 Financial Year.

In early 2020, South Yarra was scheduled for a $12 million refurbishment. The entrance to the station on Toorak Road was to be widened, and the layout changed to make the station larger.

Services on the Pakenham and Cranbourne lines will no longer stop at South Yarra when the Metro Tunnel opens, which is scheduled to take place in 2025. The entrance portal to the Metro Tunnel is located near the station, but South Yarra will not be integrated into the new tunnel, which has led to some criticism.

Platforms and services
South Yarra station has six platforms: two side platforms and two island platforms with four faces. It is served by Cranbourne, Frankston, Pakenham and Sandringham line trains.

Platform 1:
  all stations services to Flinders Street

Platform 2:
  all stations services to Sandringham

Platform 3:
  all stations services to Flinders Street, Werribee and Williamstown

Platform 4:
  all stations and limited express services to Frankston

Platform 5:
  all stations services to Flinders Street
  all stations services to Flinders Street

Platform 6:
  limited express services to Pakenham
  limited express services to Cranbourne

From 2025, Pakenham and Cranbourne lines will no longer service this station as they route through the Metro Tunnel to Sunbury.

Transport links
Yarra Trams operates one route via South Yarra station:
 : West Coburg – Toorak

Gallery

References

Further reading

External links

 Melway map at street-directory.com.au

Premium Melbourne railway stations
Railway stations in Australia opened in 1860
Railway stations in Melbourne
Railway stations in the City of Stonnington